Mill Creek Correctional Facility (MCCF) was a minimum-security prison located five miles southeast of Salem on 2,089 acres. The facility was a minimum-security work camp providing AIC labor to the Oregon Department of Corrections, other state and local agencies, and private industries throughout the Willamette Valley.  

MCCF officially closed on June 30, 2021 as part of Governor Brown's sentencing reform efforts.

History
The Mill Creek facility was built on the site of the former Oregon State Training School, a reform school for boys. In August 2014, an inmate escaped from the minimum security facility.

See also
Hillcrest Youth Correctional Facility
Mill Creek (Marion County, Oregon)
Oregon Department of Corrections

References

External links

History of Oregon's reform schools from Salem Public Library
Historic image of the Oregon State Training School from Salem Public Library

Prisons in Oregon
Buildings and structures in Marion County, Oregon
Turner, Oregon